Duke Street Railway Station is a railway station in Glasgow, Scotland.

It was built as part of the City of Glasgow Union Railway which provided a link across the Clyde (between the Glasgow and Paisley Joint Railway at Shields Junction and the Edinburgh and Glasgow Railway at Sighthill Junction).  Though goods traffic began using the line in 1875, the station was not opened until 1881 with trains initially running as far as Alexandra Park (as it was then known).  An extension to Barnhill followed two years later, but it was not until 1887 that they finally reached .

Electric operation at the station began in 1960 (using the 25 kV A.C overhead system), when the branch from Bellgrove was incorporated into the North Clyde line electrification scheme.  Through running to Cumbernauld began in May 2014 - prior to this a change at Springburn was required.

Services 

On Sundays, an hourly service between Partick and Springburn call in each direction between 9am and 8pm (there was no service on Sundays prior to May 2015).

References

Railway stations in Glasgow
Former North British Railway stations
Railway stations in Great Britain opened in 1881
Railway stations in Great Britain closed in 1917
Railway stations in Great Britain opened in 1919
SPT railway stations
Railway stations served by ScotRail
1881 establishments in Scotland